Swordmaster or Sword Master is a person skilled in the art of swordsmanship

Swordmaster may also refer to:

Characters
 Carla the Swordmaster, a character in The Secret of Monkey Island computer game
 Sword Master (Marvel Comics), a character in the Marvel universe
 Sword Master, a character in the manga/comic Afro Samurai
 Swordmaster (Soul series), a character from the Soul Calibur video game series and associated comics/manga
 Swordmaster, a gameplay style in the Devil May Cry video game series and associated comics/manga
 "Swordmaster", Dungeon & Fighter OF Famole slayer Class

Other
 Sword Master (film), a 2016 Chinese film directed by Derek Of Yee
 Sword Master (video game), a 1990 NES video game
 The Swordmaster, the official publication of the U.S. Fencing Coaches Association
 "Swordmaster", a song on Battlelore's 2002 debut album ...Where the Shadows Lie
 "Swordmaster", a song on 3 Inches of Blood's 2004 album Advance and Vanquish

See also
 The Swordmasters of Dune, the original name of the 2016 novel Navigators of Dune by Brian Herbert and Kevin J. Anderson
 Swordmasters of Ginaz, an organization in the Dune universe